Peter Crawford may refer to:
 Peter Crawford (filmmaker), British filmmaker, author, photographer and lecturer
 Peter Crawford (basketball) (born 1979), Australian international basketball player
 Peter Crawford (Australian politician) (born 1949), politician from New South Wales
 Peter Crawford, pre-Civil War politician from Georgia and father of Georgia governor George W. Crawford   
 Peter Crawford, 13 times UK spearfishing champion
 Peter Crawford (land surveyor) (1818–1888), Scottish-born land surveyor and pioneer in the Pacific Northwest.